Sam Patterson was an American football coach. He was the second head football coach at Southern Illinois Normal College—now known as Southern Illinois University Carbondale—serving for one season, in 1917, and compiling a record of 2–2.

Head coaching record

References

Year of birth missing
Year of death missing
Southern Illinois Salukis football coaches